Smartbomb 2.3: The Underground Mixes is the second remix album by Canadian Cyberpunk/Industrial metal band Left Spine Down. The double album features remixes from across the industrial and EBM spectrum from mind.in.a.box, Angelspit and Cyanotic to Psy'Aviah and Dismantled; along with all three of the band's music videos.

Track listing

References

External links
Left Spine Down Official Site
Synthetic Sounds Official Site
Discogs.com Listing
Fighting for Voltage on Amazon.ca
Fighting for Voltage on Amazon MP3 Store

2009 remix albums
Left Spine Down albums